Selim Abdulakim (also transliterated in Romanian as: Selim Abdulachim; 1886–1943) known as the first Crimean Tatar lawyer in Romania was a leading politician of the Tatars in Romania, an activist for ethnic Tatar causes.

Biography
Selim was born in 1886. He was the brother of Second Lieutenant Kázím Abdulakim, a World War I hero of the Romanian Army who lost his life during the Battle of Mărăşeşti in 1917. Selim's sister Şefika, also known as Sapiye, was the wife of the beloved Crimean Tatar poet Memet Niyaziy. Selim was married to Sayide (also spelled in Romanian as Saide).

Since 1911 he studied at Bucharest Law Faculty. Between the two wars Selim was president of the Muslim community in Constanța and Deputy Mayor of Constanța. He was a Member of the Romanian Parliament where he defended the rights of the Muslims of Dobruja. He warned that as none of their wishes were taken into account, their emigration is a national threat.

Selim loved to be of help and support for young people. In 1929 he founded Selim Abdulakim Muslim Cultural Fund, a cultural association aimed at helping Muslim students from secondary schools and higher education, which had its office located in Constanța, at the corner of Ferdinand Avenue and Mircea cel Batran Street. 

Selim died on 28 March 1943 in Constanța. He is resting in Constanța Muslim Central Cemetery at: 44.173120|28.622248. His wife, Sayide (1894–1967), rests in close proximity.

See also
 Kázím Abdulakim
 Memet Niyaziy

References

Sources 

 
 
 
 
 
 
 
 

1943 deaths
Crimean Tatar activists
Crimean Tatar lawyers
Crimean Tatar politicians
Romanian people of Crimean Tatar descent
Romanian Muslims
People from Constanța County
1886 births